Sergey Ivanovich Kovalenko (born 11 August 1947, died 18 November 2004 at age 57 in Kyiv) was a Soviet Ukrainian basketball player who won the gold medal with the Soviet basketball team in the 1972 Olympics. He played for CSKA Moscow (1976–1980).

Notes

1947 births
Olympic basketball players of the Soviet Union
Basketball players at the 1972 Summer Olympics
Basketball players at the 1968 Summer Olympics
Soviet men's basketball players
1970 FIBA World Championship players
PBC CSKA Moscow players
Olympic gold medalists for the Soviet Union
Olympic bronze medalists for the Soviet Union
Burevestnik (sports society) athletes
FIBA EuroBasket-winning players
2004 deaths
Olympic medalists in basketball
Basketball players from Dalian
BC Budivelnyk players
Ukrainian men's basketball players
Avanhard (sports society) sportspeople
Medalists at the 1972 Summer Olympics
Medalists at the 1968 Summer Olympics
Centers (basketball)